Discipline Manifesto is the fourth full length studio album, and seventh album overall, by the black metal band Naer Mataron. It was released in 2005 on Black Lotus Records.

Track listing
Extreme Unction - 9:43
Blessing of Sin - 7:51
For the New Man - 3:04
Arrival of the Cesar - 5:58
Blast Furnace - 4:54
The Day Is Breaking - 7:00
The Last Loyal - 5:27
Land of Dreams - 6:01
Last Man Against Time - 9:15

References

External links
Official homepage
Metal Archives
Archaic Mag review

2005 albums
Naer Mataron albums